Ha Yau Tin Tsuen is a village in the Shap Pat Heung area of Yuen Long District, Hong Kong.

Administration
Ha Yau Tin Tsuen is a recognized village under the New Territories Small House Policy. For district councils electoral purposes, Ha Yau Tin Tsuen was part of the Shap Pat Heung Central constituency in 2019.

See also
 Sheung Yau Tin Tsuen

References

External links

 Delineation of area of existing village Hau Yau Tin (Shap Pat Heung) for election of resident representative (2019 to 2022)

Villages in Yuen Long District, Hong Kong
Shap Pat Heung